Urosalpinx rusticus is an extinct species of sea snail, a marine gastropod mollusk in the family Muricidae, the murex snails or rock snails.

Description
The length of the shell attains 42 mm.

Distribution
Fossils were found in Miocene strata of Virginia and Maryland, USA (age range:  11.608 to 5.332 Ma)

References

 G. C. Martin. 1904. Gastropoda. Maryland Geological Survey Miocene(Text):131-269

External links
 WMSDB: Urosalpinx rusticus

rusticus
Gastropods described in 1839
Miocene gastropods